San Pio delle Camere is a comune and town in the province of L'Aquila in the Abruzzo region of central Italy.

Main sights
 The medieval castle
 Medieval borough of Castelnuovo
 Parish church of San Pietro Celestino, dedicated to Pope Celestine V. It has a Latin cross plan with a nave and two aisles, with elements in both Renaissance and Baroque style.
 Peltuinum

References